Irlande Côté is a Canadian actress from Quebec.

Biography
She is most noted for her performance in the film A Colony (Une colonie), for which she received a Canadian Screen Award nomination for Best Supporting Actress at the 7th Canadian Screen Awards in 2019, and a Prix Iris nomination for Revelation of the Year at the 21st Quebec Cinema Awards.

Filmography

Television
 2015 : 7$ par jour : Irlande
 2016 : Mémoires vives : Gabriella
 2019 : Les Ephémères : Maïka
 2020 : Claire et les vieux : Claire
 2020 : Portrait-robot : Romane Lever
 2021 : Comment tu t’appelles? : Irlande
 2021 : Plan B : Mégane
 2022 : Les bracelets rouges : Lili
 2022 : Avant le crash : Florence

Film
 2013 : Louis Cyr (Louis Cyr : L'Homme le plus fort du monde) : Louis Cyr's Sister
 2018 : A Colony (Une colonie) : Camille
 2019 : Le Prince de Val-Bé : Jordane-Ève
 2019 : Recrue : Marianne
 2021 : Magasin général : Madeleine
 2021 : 18 ans : Charlie
 2021 : Boulevard 132 : Josette
 2022 : Feu rouge : Manue
 2022 : 1+1+1 : Flavie
 2022 : An Empty Seat : Nina

References

External links

Canadian film actresses
Canadian child actresses
Actresses from Quebec
French Quebecers
Living people
2009 births